The 2017 Richmond Kickers season was the club's twenty-fifth season of existence. It was also the Kickers' 10th season playing in the second-tier of American soccer, and their first season in the second division since 2005. The Kickers played in the United Soccer League for their sixth straight season.

For only the third time in the club's history, the Kickers failed to qualify for the playoffs. It was Richmond's first season since 2003 where they failed to qualify. The Kickers amassed a club low, 25 goals in the 32-match season. The club finished 14th out of 15 teams in the USL's Eastern Conference, and finished 26th in the 30-team league. The Kickers also suffered a second round exit in the U.S. Open Cup, losing to amateur outfit, Christos FC. It was the Kickers' shortest spell in the Open Cup since 2009.  Off the field, the Kickers enjoyed their highest ever league attendance, averaging 4,665 fans per match.

Background 

The Kickers finished the 2016 season ranked seventh in the Eastern Conference, and earned a berth into the 2016 USL Playoffs. Richmond lost in their first round match-up to Louisville City. Midfielder Yudai Imura lead the Kickers with 10 goals in league play and 11 goals across all competitions.

Transfers

Transfers in 

|-
|}

Transfers out

Non-competitive

Preseason exhibitions

Midseason exhibitions

Competitive

USL

Standings

Results

U.S. Open Cup

Statistics

Squad, appearances and goals

Italics indicate player no longer on team roster.

Top scorers

As of October 17, 2017.

See also 
 Richmond Kickers
 2017 D.C. United season

References

External links 
Richmond Kickers Official Website

Richmond Kickers seasons
Richmond Kickers
Richmond Kickers
Richmond Kickers